Hunters Run is a tributary to Neshannock Creek in western Pennsylvania.  The stream rises in northeastern Lawrence County and flows northwest entering Neshannock Creek near Springfield Falls, Pennsylvania. The watershed is roughly 32% agricultural, 60% forested and the rest is other uses.  This watershed drains the northern portion of State Game Lands #284 and is the location for Springfield Falls, a prominent waterfall on the run.

References

Rivers of Pennsylvania
Tributaries of the Beaver River
Rivers of Lawrence County, Pennsylvania
Rivers of Mercer County, Pennsylvania